Metamorphic series include the Barrovian and Buchan series of metamorphic rocks. George Barrow was a geologist in Scotland who discovered the Barrovian series. These are also called metamorphic facies series. A metamorphic facies series is a sequence of metamorphic facies which plot in a temperature-pressure diagram along a line, and this line represents a certain geothermal gradient. They are not the same as metamorphic zones, as these are defined as a region on a geological map where the pressure-temperature conditions for an index mineral (a mineral that indicates the approximate metamorphic grade of a rock), were appropriate for these minerals to form.

 Buchan metamorphism has the facies series greenschist-amphibolite-granulite
 Barrovian metamorphism has the same facies series but has approximately 1 kbar more pressure so these rocks form kyanite

References 

Geology
Metamorphic rocks